Francesco Cozza (1605 – 13 January 1682) was an Italian painter of the Baroque period.

Life
Cozza was born in Stilo in Calabria and died in Rome. As a young man, he went to Rome where he was apprenticed to Domenichino, with whom he traveled to Naples in 1634.

He is best known for his expansive panegyric ceiling fresco, Apotheosis of Pamphili House (1667-1673) in the library of Palazzo Pamphili in Piazza Navona in Rome. During 1658 to 1659, he frescoed the Stanza del Fuoco in Palazzo Pamphili in Valmontone,  working alongside Pier Francesco Mola, Gaspar Dughet, Mattia Preti, Giovanni Battista Tassi (il Cortonese), and Guglielmo Cortese. He also collaborated with Carlo Maratta and Domenico Maria Canuti in the fresco decorations of the Palazzo Altieri. His landscape paintings recall the Carracci style of paesi con figure piccole (landscapes with small figures). He painted a Madonna del Riscatto in church of Santa Francesca Romana. He was received into the Accademia di San Luca at Rome in 1650.

He etched several plates in the style of Pietro del Po, including a St. Peter (1630); a Christ sleeping and adored by Angels and a St Mary Magdalene (1650).

Gallery

References

Sources

1605 births
1682 deaths
17th-century Italian painters
Italian male painters
Italian Baroque painters
People from Stilo
Italian etchers